Old Bewick is a village and former civil parish, now in the parish of Bewick, in the county of Northumberland, England, notable for its Bronze Age cairn, Iron Age hill fort, and rock art (petroglyphs) exhibiting the characteristic cup and ring marks. In 1951 the parish had a population of 82.

Governance 
Old Bewick is in the parliamentary constituency of Berwick-upon-Tweed. Old Bewick was formerly a township; from 1866 Old Bewick was a civil parish in its own right until it was abolished on 1 April 1955 to form Bewick.

References

External links

Megalithic walks site
 Panoramic photograph by Peter Loud of the interior of the Old Bewick church

Villages in Northumberland
Former civil parishes in Northumberland